Renée Dahon (1893–1969) was a French actress.

Personal life
Dahon was born on 18 December 1893. She was described as short (around five feet tall) and slim.

Following an eight-year-long affair, Dahon married playwright Maurice Maeterlinck at Chateau Neuf-de-Contes in 1919. In the early 1930s, Dahon gave birth to a stillborn child. In 1940, Maeterlinck and Dahon were forced to flee their home in Paris with her parents due to the advance of the Germans. They arrived in the United States in July 1940, and resettled in New York City, moving into an apartment in the Hotel Esplanade. After the war, they were able to return to their home "Orlamonde" in Nice in 1947. Despite their age difference, friends reported them to be devoted to each other.

Dahon died on 8 December 1969.

Career
Renée Dahon was a popular actress in Paris. She became known at age 18 for her role as Tyltyl in The Blue Bird. Georgette Leblanc, Maurice Maeterlinck's then-partner, selected and coached her for the role. She also acted in several films.

References

External links
 Still shot of Renée Dahon (Countess Maeterlinck) from a 1959 interview (via Europeana)
 Photograph of group of writers, including Maurice Maeterlinck and Renée Maeterlinck, from 1938 (via University of Florida Digital Collections)

1893 births
1969 deaths
French actresses
20th-century French women